This article contains a list of democracy indices produced by several non-governmental organizations that publish and maintain assessments of the state of democracy in the world, according to their own various definitions of the term.

Prominent democracy indices
V-Dem Democracy indices by V-Dem Institute distinguishes between five high-level principles of democracy: electoral, liberal, participatory, deliberative, and egalitarian, and quantifies these principles. The V-Dem Democracy indices include the Citizen-initiated component of direct popular vote index, which indicates the strength of direct democracy and the presidentialism index, which indicates higher concentration of political power in the hands of one individual.
International IDEAs  "Global State of Democracy Report" assesses democratic performance using different types of sources: expert surveys, standards-based coding by research groups and analysts, observational data and composite measures.
 The Democracy Index, by the UK-based Economist Intelligence Unit, is an assessment of countries' democracy. Countries are rated as full democracies, flawed democracies, hybrid regimes, or authoritarian regimes. The index is based on five different categories measuring pluralism, civil liberties, and political culture.
 The Polity data series contains annual information on regime authority characteristics and covers the years 1800–2018 based on competitiveness, openness, and level of participation, sponsored by the Political Instability Task Force (PITF).
 Democracy-Dictatorship Index is a binary measure of democracy and dictatorship.
 The Gallagher index measures an electoral system's relative disproportionality between votes received and seats in a legislature.
 Effective number of parties is an index of the adjusted number of political parties in a country's party system.
 Democracy Ranking is a democracy ranking by the Association for Development and Advancement of the Democracy Award.

Maps of indices

Notes and references 

International rankings
Democracy
Index numbers